"Travelin' Soldier" is a song written and originally recorded by American country music artist Bruce Robison in 1996 and again, in rewritten form, in 1999. It was later recorded by Ty England on his 1999 album, Highways & Dance Halls. The first rendition to be issued as a single was by Dixie Chicks in December 2002, from their album Home. It became the group's sixth and final single to reach No. 1 on Billboard "Hot Country Singles & Tracks" (now "Hot Country Songs").  A version of the song featuring  Natalie Maines, Bruce Robison and Robison's wife, Kelly Willis, appears on KGSR's Broadcasts Vol. 13 album.

Content
The song is a tale about a shy, lonesome, young American soldier who strikes up a conversation and later a correspondence with a high school girl during the Vietnam War era. Americana details pervade the lyrics as the song details the correspondence as a relationship forms between the two, despite the insurmountable distance. The last letter from the soldier mentions that "it's gettin kinda rough over here" and he "won't be able to write for a while" before skipping ahead to a football game at the girl's high school. After the anthem and Lord's Prayer, the local Vietnam dead are announced. The soldier's name is on the list, but only the girl, who is there, recognizes his name, and she mourns for him as stated in the line "One name read and nobody really cared but a pretty little girl with a bow in her hair."

Critical reception
Kevin John Coyne, reviewing the song for Country Universe, rated the song No. 17 on his list of the 201 Greatest Singles of the Decade. He stated that "it's the story between the lines that drives home the tragedy, as both main characters have a palpable sense of loneliness that they finally find relief from in one another just before they are ripped permanently apart."

Controversy

The song was being promoted by Dixie Chicks when on March 10, 2003, lead singer Natalie Maines told a London, England, audience the band was ashamed that then United States President George W. Bush was from Texas for his role in the 2003 invasion of Iraq. Subsequent U.S. publication of Maines's comments caused some stations, including 42 owned by Cumulus Media, to drop the song from their playlists, causing it to fall from No. 1 on the country singles chart to No. 3 the following week, March 29, before disappearing from the charts entirely.

"Travelin' Soldier" is the last single released by Dixie Chicks to reach the top 20 on the U.S. country singles chart, although their 2007 single "Not Ready to Make Nice", peaked at No. 4 on the Billboard Hot 100 while reaching No. 36 on the country chart.

Charts
The song debuted at No. 58 on Hot Country Songs on February 16, 2002, based on a live recording from the Country Music Association telecast in the previous November, eventually peaking at No. 57. It was not officially released as a single until late 2002, peaking at No. 1 on the same chart in early 2003.

Weekly charts

Year-end charts

Other versions
Sheryl Crow released a cover in 2003, shortly after the Dixie Chicks' version fell from No. 1.

Home Free released a cover in 2021 with the gender roles reversed, on their album Land of the Free.

See also
List of anti-war songs

References

1996 songs
2002 singles
Bruce Robison songs
Ty England songs
The Chicks songs
Songs written by Bruce Robison
Songs about the military
Songs about soldiers
Songs of the Vietnam War
Anti-war songs
Columbia Nashville Records singles
Song recordings produced by Lloyd Maines